Lava Records (Lava Music, LLC) is an American record label owned by Jason Flom in partnership with Universal Music Group.

Company history
In 1995, Flom launched Lava Records in partnership with Atlantic Records. For the next decade, he continued to discover and champion artists under the Lava label who went on to sell over 100 million records globally, including Matchbox 20, Kid Rock, The Corrs, Simple Plan, The Blue Man Group, Edwin McCain, Sugar Ray and Trans-Siberian Orchestra. Flom also signed his first black artist, David Josias, known for his hit single “ Mindblowin”.

In 2004, Flom sold Lava Records to Atlantic Records Group, where he was named Chairman and CEO of the Atlantic Records Group. In this role, he oversaw a resurgence of the storied label where he had once worked in the mailroom, and continued to sign and break major artists, including Hayley Williams’ band Paramore.

Following 15 years of record-setting success at Atlantic and Lava, Flom was tapped in 2005 as Chairman and CEO of Virgin Records. In 2007, he led a merger with Capitol Records to create the Capitol Music Group, where he was named Chairman and CEO. During Flom’s tenure, he oversaw successful releases from established superstars including Lenny Kravitz, Coldplay, and the Rolling Stones. In keeping with his track record of identifying and supporting new talent, under Flom’s leadership eleven new artists rose to gold, platinum and multi-platinum status, including Jared Leto’s band Thirty Seconds to Mars, and in 2007 he signed Katy Perry and personally A&R’d her international #1 smash hit debut album, One of the Boys.

In 2008, Flom departed Capitol Music Group to re-launch his own Lava Records label, this time in partnership with Universal Music Group’s industry-leading Republic Records. There he signed Jessie J, whose 2011 singles under the Lava banner "Do It Like a Dude" and "Price Tag" featuring B.o.B, topped the singles charts in the UK and 17 other countries. Her multi-platinum debut album Who You Are sold over three million copies worldwide.

In 2013, Flom identified Lorde, a then-unknown artist from New Zealand, and Lava released her ground-breaking debut single, "Royals," which reigned at #1 on the Billboard Hot 100 chart for eight weeks, becoming the biggest alternative radio hit by a female artist in history. Lorde went on to win two Grammy Awards including Song of the Year for “Royals” at the 56th Annual Grammy Awards.

Following successful Lava rock releases from Black Veil Brides and their frontman, Andy Black, Flom signed breakthrough rock band Greta Van Fleet to Lava in 2017, who revitalized the global rock scene with multiple #1 rock hits and over 1 million albums sold, all while nonstop touring over the last several years. When Robert Plant was asked about Greta Van Fleet in an interview with Australia's Network Ten, he proclaimed, "They are Led Zeppelin I," and described 21-year-old Josh Kiszka as "...a beautiful little singer. I hate him.” Elton John lauded the band in the LA Times: "Whoever says rock music is dead is completely wrong. When I first saw them, they knocked me out...They are going to be one of the biggest bands of the year." The band picked up four nominations at the 2018 Grammy Awards and won the Grammy Award for Best Rock Album for their Lava debut From the Fires.

Flom founded Lava Publishing in 2014, which includes among its roster of writers break-out alternative rocker Evan Konrad, writer/performer Maty Noyes, and all four members of Greta Van Fleet. Flom also founded podcast company Lava for Good.

Label roster

Current artists
Greta Van Fleet
The Warning
Lorde
Jessie J
Poppy
somegirlnamedanna
Trans-Siberian Orchestra
Yonaka

Past artists
David Josias
Tony C. and the Truth
Black Veil Brides
Maty Noyes
The Royal Concept
Travis Mills
Carah Faye
Clairity
G4SHI
Liam Lis
Jetta
Katy Tiz
The Atomic Fireballs
Liquid Gang
Authority Zero
Bel Canto
Bif Naked
The Boondock Saints
CIV
Course of Nature
Cold
The Corrs
The Cult
Egypt Central
Willa Ford
Grade 8
Hot Action Cop
Little-T And One Track Mike
Matchbox Twenty
Edwin McCain
Nonpoint
Needtobreathe
Franky Perez
Porcupine Tree
Smile Empty Soul
Jill Sobule
Sugar Ray
Unwritten Law
Vanessa Williams
Antigone Rising
Blue Man Group
Joe Brooks
John Butler Trio
Cherie
The Click Five
Embrace 
Kid Rock
Toby Lightman
O.A.R.
Simple Plan
Skillet
Skindred
Uncle Kracker
Vaux
Fountains of Wayne
Andy Black
Evan Konrad
Stanaj
Hero the Band
South of Eden
JunkBunny
Leo The Kind
Kat Cunning

References

Record labels established in 1995
Record labels established in 2009
Re-established companies
American record labels
Rock record labels
Pop record labels
Alternative rock record labels
Republic Records
Labels distributed by Universal Music Group